Cudworth & Woodworth, later Cudworth, Woodworth & Thompson and Cudworth & Thompson, was an architectural firm from Norwich, Connecticut.

Partner biographies
Edward Aldrich Cudworth was born December 11, 1861 in Boston. He attended Roxbury Latin School, before moving on to Harvard University, class of 1884. Originally going into sales, he switched to architecture. He attended the Massachusetts Institute of Technology for two years, and worked for H. H. Richardson and Cummings & Sears in Massachusetts and Clarence Sumner Luce in New York City. In 1887 he left Luce and went to Norwich, forming a partnership with James A. Hiscox. Neither understood the business fully, and Cudworth & Hiscox rarely made a profit in the two years it was in business. After 1889, he for several architects and engineers in Boston until 1895, when he went to work for Norwich architect Charles H. Preston. He remained with Preston until 1899, when he opened his own office. In 1901 Walter H. Woodworth joined the firm, and died in 1915. Cudworth died in 1937, and was buried in Norwich.

Walter H. Woodworth was born on October 8, 1874 in Quaker Hill, Connecticut. He was trained in construction, and in 1901 became a construction superintendent for J. A. Hiscox, Cudworth's erstwhile partner. Only a few months later, he joined Cudworth as partner. A few years later he fell ill, and gradually retired from active practice. In 1915 A. M. Thompson was added as partner, and Woodworth died soon after, on June 1, 1915.

Arthur M. Thompson became a partner in the firm in 1915, which became Cudworth, Woodworth & Thompson. In 1916, it was renamed Cudworth & Thompson. Thompson operated the firm past Cudworth's 1937 death, into the 1940s.

Architectural works

Cudworth & Woodworth, 1901-1915
 1901 - Danielson M. E. Church, 9 Spring St, Danielson, Connecticut
 1903 - Norwich State Hospital, Laurel Hill Rd, Preston, Connecticut
 The firm built further buildings on the campus through the 1930s, but only the 1903 administration building stands.
 1906 - Converse Art Gallery, Norwich Free Academy, Norwich, Connecticut
 1907 - Thomas Loan and Trust Building, 34 Courthouse Sq, Norwich, Connecticut
 1909 - Tirrell Building, Norwich Free Academy, Norwich, Connecticut
 1910 - John L. Mitchell House, 5 Rockwell Ter, Norwich, Connecticut
 1911 - Chelsea Savings Bank Building, Main & Cliff Sts, Norwich, Connecticut
 1912 - First National Bank Building, 22 Railroad Ave, Plainfield, Connecticut
 1914 - Addition to Elks Club, Norwich, Connecticut

Cudworth, Woodworth & Thompson, 1915-1916
 1916 - Mansfield State Training School and Hospital, Middle Tpk, Mansfield, Connecticut

Cudworth & Thompson, 1916-1940s
 1917 - Holy Trinity Greek Orthodox Church, 80 Water St, Danielson, Connecticut
 1917 - Parish House for Hanover Congregational Church, 266 Main St, Baltic, Connecticut
 1920 - Shetucket Co. Office Building, 387 N Main St, Norwich, Connecticut
 1921 - Disco Building, 257 Main St, Norwich, Connecticut
 1925 - Elks Club, 198 Pleasant St, Willimantic, Connecticut
 1928 - Fanning Annex to the Slater Library, 26 Main St, Jewett City, Connecticut
 1928 - Masonic Temple, 194 Washington St, Norwich, Connecticut
 The building was built on the site of a native burial ground, and was purchased (1999) and demolished (2006) by the Mohegan tribe.
 1929 - Jewett City Savings Bank Building, 111 Main St, Jewett City, Connecticut
 1929 - Undercliff Sanitarium, Undercliff Rd, Meriden, Connecticut
 Demolished in 2013.
 1942 - Oakwood Knoll Apartments, Oakwood Knoll, Norwich, Connecticut

Gallery of architectural works

References

Architecture firms based in Connecticut
Defunct architecture firms based in Connecticut
Design companies established in 1901
1901 establishments in Connecticut
Design companies disestablished in 1915
1915 disestablishments in Connecticut